Ingegjerd Ebba Dagmar Løvenskiold Stuart, née Andvord (born 27 September 1931) is a Swedish-Norwegian courtier, she holds the position of Mistress of the Robes to Queen Sonja.

Early life 
She is a daughter of diplomat Rolf Otto Andvord and Ingrid Anna Kristina Sten.  Her parents divorced when she was five years old, following which she lived in Sweden with her Swedish mother and stepfather. She has one sister Anita who married Ulf Ander.

Marriage and issue 
While visiting her father in Paris, she met business magnate Harald Løvenskiold, member of Løvenskiold noble family whom she married in 1951. On her marriage, she became a daughter-in-law of Carl Otto Løvenskiold (1898–1969) and mother of Carl Otto Løvenskiold (born 1953).

Later life 
From 1952, Løvenskiold Stuart was involved with the modernisation of the buildings at Bærums Verk together with the Directorate for Cultural Heritage. The industry at Bærums Verk was eventually closed down, and the locality was transformed into a shopping mall Handelsstedet Bærums Verk which opened in 1985. The same year she was recruited by Sonja of Norway as mistress of the robes in the royal court  after Else Werring.

She has been active in the local branches of the Conservative Party, Norges Forsvarsforening and the Norwegian Women's Public Health Association. After her husband died in 1994, she married Robert Stuart in 1995. Stuart was the US ambassador to Norway from 1985 to 1989. The couple resided in Lake Forest, Illinois.

In 1989 she was decorated as a Commander of the Order of St. Olav. In 2009 a statue of her was erected at Bærums Verk.

Also is a member of the Royal Family Order of Harald V of Norway.

References

1931 births
Living people
Ingegjerd
People from Bærum
Norwegian people of Swedish descent
Norwegian expatriates in the United States
Mistresses of the Robes (Norway)